Ilya Konstantinov (born 23 March 1970) is a Russian water polo player. He competed in the men's tournament at the 1996 Summer Olympics.

References

1970 births
Living people
Russian male water polo players
Olympic water polo players of Russia
Water polo players at the 1996 Summer Olympics
Place of birth missing (living people)